Petersson is a Swedish patronymic surname meaning "son of Peter". There are alternate Danish, Dutch, English, German, Latvian and Norwegian spellings.
Numbers in Sweden:
 Petersson 26 236
 Peterson 1 963
 Peterzon 50
 Petersohn 24 

Notable people with the surname include:

Alexander Petersson, Latvian/Icelandic handball player
Alfred Petersson (1860–1920), Swedish politician
André Petersson, Swedish ice hockey player
Axel Petersson, Swedish engineer
Axel Petersson Döderhultarn (1868–1925), Swedish Master woodcarver
Bo Petersson, Swedish football manager and former football player
Bobbo Petersson (born 1992), Swedish ice hockey player
Göran Petersson, Swedish lawyer, sailor and sports official
Gunnar Petersson, Swedish javelin thrower
Harald G. Petersson  (1904–1977), German screenwriter
Hans Joakim Petersson, Swedish rockstar
Hans Petersson  (1902–1984), German mathematician
Håvard Vad Petersson, Norwegian curler
Helene Petersson, Swedish social democratic politician
 Johan Petersson (handballer), Swedish handball player
 Johan Petersson (comedian), Swedish comedian, actor, television presenter and author
Johanna Petersson (1807–1899), pioneering Swedish businesswoman
Magnus Petersson, Swedish archer
Rudolf Petersson  (1896–1970), Swedish artist and creator of a popular Swedish comic
Simon Petersson,  Swedish ice hockey defenceman
Tom Petersson, American bassist for the rock band Cheap Trick
Torkel Petersson, Swedish actor
Viljo Petersson-Dahl (born 1982), Swedish wheelchair curler
William Petersson (1895–1965), Swedish athlete

References

Swedish-language surnames
Patronymic surnames
Surnames from given names